LaGrange High School may refer to:

LaGrange High School (Georgia) in LaGrange, Georgia
LaGrange High School (Louisiana) in Lake Charles, Louisiana

Schools with similar names include:
La Grange High School in La Grange, Texas